Puerto Rico Highway 180 (PR-180) is a bypass located near downtown Salinas, Puerto Rico. This road extends from PR-1 (north of downtown), near PR-52, to PR-701 (south of downtown) and is known as Avenida Pedro Albizu Campos.

Major intersections

See also

 List of highways numbered 180

References

External links
 

180
Salinas, Puerto Rico